Blue County may refer to:

 Blue County (duo), an American country music duo
 Blue County (album), a 2004 album by the group
 Blue County, Choctaw Nation, a former political subdivision of the Choctaw Nation in the Indian Territory

See also
 Blue Country, a 1979 album by Joe Dassin